James Hunter Williams (June 17, 1926 – December 16, 2016), known as Jim Williams or J. H. Williams, was an American politician and member of the Democratic Party.
Williams is best known for serving as the 11th Lieutenant Governor of Florida from 1975 to 1979, and as the United States Deputy Secretary of Agriculture from 1979 to 1981.

Prior to his selection as Governor Reubin Askew's running mate during Askew's 1974 reelection campaign, Williams served for six years in the Florida Senate, representing parts of north-central Florida including his home county of Marion. In the Askew administration, Williams also served as Secretary of the Department of Administration and chairman of the state Bicentennial Commission. Williams ran for governor in 1978, but lost the Democratic nomination to Bob Graham. He was succeeded as lieutenant governor by fellow Democrat Wayne Mixson, Graham's running mate.

Following his tenure in state government, Williams served as the Deputy Secretary of the U.S. Department of Agriculture in the Jimmy Carter administration. After Carter's defeat for reelection in 1980, Williams served as a founding director of the SunTrust Bank Holding Company.

Williams died on December 16, 2016. He ran a real estate agency in Ocala, Florida with other employers and members of his family. Jim Williams and his family have also given a vast amount of protected land to Marion County, and own and maintain some orange groves. He served on the governing board of the agency that protects Lake Weir, an important aspect of his home city. The lake's tributary, the Ocklawaha River, would have been damaged if plans had continued to divert its water.

Education
Jim Williams received his bachelor's degree in Political Science from the University of Florida.

References

External links
 Williams's Bio on Water Management site

1926 births
2016 deaths
Democratic Party Florida state senators
Lieutenant Governors of Florida
State cabinet secretaries of Florida
20th-century American politicians
University of Florida College of Liberal Arts and Sciences alumni
United States Deputy Secretaries of Agriculture
Carter administration personnel
Politicians from Ocala, Florida